Mount Pleasant is an unincorporated community in Wayne County, in the U.S. state of Georgia.

History
A post office called Mount Pleasant was established in 1855, and remained in operation until 1948. Despite its commendatory name, Mount Pleasant is situated in a flat area.

References

Unincorporated communities in Wayne County, Georgia